Notodonta dromedarius, the iron prominent, is a moth of the family Notodontidae. The species was first described by Carl Linnaeus in 1767. It is found in Europe and Anatolia.

The wingspan is 35–40 mm. Notodonta dromedarius has grey or dark brown forewings with rusty and yellowish stains. A broken rust-brown band runs along the outside edge of the forewing. There is a small discal spot, a postmedial crossline which is often broken and outer margins which are suffused dark red. The hindwings are usually  pale grey-brown with dark veining. The colouring is very variable and very dark specimens are found.

The moth flies from April to August depending on the location.

The larvae feed on Corylus avellana, birch, alder and oak.

References

Further reading
South R. (1907) The Moths of the British Isles,  (First Series), Frederick Warne & Co. Ltd.,  London & NY: 359 pp. online

External links

Iron prominent on UKMoths
Fauna Europaea
Lepidoptera of Belgium
Lepiforum e.V.
De Vlinderstichting 

Notodontidae
Moths of Europe
Moths of Asia
Moths described in 1767
Taxa named by Carl Linnaeus